Benactyzine is an anticholinergic drug that was used as an antidepressant in the treatment of depression and associated anxiety before it was pulled from the U.S. market by the FDA due to its ineffectiveness.

Its use for these indications was limited by side effects such as dry mouth and nausea, and at high doses it can cause more severe symptoms such as deliriant and hallucinogenic effects. "Large doses of benactyzine in normal subjects may produce a state resembling the action of mescaline or LSD."

Brand names have included: Suavitil, Phebex, Phobex, Cedad, Cevanol, Deprol, Lucidil, Morcain, Nutinal, Parasan. While there was some tentative evidence of effectiveness when combined with meprobamate, with the medication no longer available it is not clinically important.

History 
Benactyzine was brought to market in the US in 1957 by Merck under the tradename, Suavitil.

References

External links

Diethylamino compounds
Deliriants
Muscarinic antagonists
Benzilate esters